Le Guérisseur is a French drama film from 1953, directed by Yves Ciampi and written by Jacques-Laurent Bost, starring Dieter Borsche and Jean Marais. The film was released in other countries under the titles Der Arzt und das Mädchen (Austria/Germany), De wonderdokter (Belgium), and Flickan och polisen (Sweden).

Cast 
 Jean Marais : Pierre Lachaux dit Laurent Le Guérisseur 
 Danièle Delorme : Isabelle Dancey, modiste de Paris
 Maurice Ronet : André Turenne
 Dieter Borsche : Dr. Jean Scheffer (de la Faculté en Bretagne)
 Jean Murat : Professeur Chataignier
 Jean Galland : Michel Boëldieu
 Pierre Mondy : Robert, assistant de Laurent
 Marianne Oswald : The healer Lucie
 Jim Gérald : Virolet, le rebouteux
 Colette Régis : Louise Mériadec, la tante d'Isabelle
 Renée Passeur : La comtesse

References

External links 
pour visionner - rechercher sur l'EMULE, une copie de VHS, 700Mb
 
 Le Guérisseur (1953) at the Films de France

1953 films
French drama films
1950s French-language films
French black-and-white films
Films directed by Yves Ciampi
1953 drama films
1950s French films